DEMOS (Demos) was the first internet service provider in the USSR.

History 
DEMOS was established in 1989 in Moscow as a programmers' cooperative, which included employees of the Kurchatov Institute. For the first few months, the cooperative was called "Interface"; then it was renamed in honor of the DEMOS operating system.  In 1990, DEMOS, in cooperation with the scientific network Relkom, registered a top-level domain . This domain become the starting point for development of the Russian segment of the Internet - RUnet.

See also
 Kremvax

References

External links
 Site of DEMOS (in Russian)
 DEMOS history by Michael Davidov (in Russian)
 Relcom history (in Russian) 

History of the Internet
Internet service providers of Russia
Companies based in Moscow